is a science fiction video game developed by Riverhillsoft and published by Electronic Arts for the PlayStation in 1997. It is considered the first survival horror game to make use of a fully three-dimensional virtual environment. The game was released on the Japanese PlayStation Network Store on February 23, 2011.

Gameplay
Part adventure game and part survival horror, Overblood incorporates elements of arcade, fighting and puzzle games. The player is able to toggle the camera between first- and third-person, both of which are required to solve the game's various puzzles.

Synopsis

Plot
Overblood takes place at Lystra Laboratories' hidden research center where a team of scientists have been conducting controversial genetic experiments. The game begins when a system malfunction releases the player character, Raz Karcy (Lars in European releases), from a cryogenic container.  Cold and confused, he awakens with no memory.  Concerns about his identity are soon replaced by an urgent need to escape, as he reveals the scientists' fateful plan and his role in it.

Characters
The game features three playable characters. The majority of the game is played as Raz Karcy, the game's protagonist. Other playable characters include Milly Azray, a woman who befriends Raz, and Pipo, a small and very helpful robot.

Reception and legacy

Reviews for Overblood were mixed, with critics generally commenting that it has enough interesting elements to make it respectable, but is ultimately not worth buying. The most frequent criticism was that the game is too slow-paced and lacking in tension, with too much time spent wandering corridors and opening doors, relatively little time spent on puzzles, and far too little time spent on action sequences. Compounding this problem, many critics found the action sequences too simplistic. Joe Fielder elaborated in GameSpot that "They entail moving at just the right moment and are more timing than skill-based."

The need to switch between three different playable characters in order to solve certain puzzles was often cited as one of OverBloods most interesting aspects. Some also praised the story. The game was reviewed by GameFan Magazine, where the game's previously rumored similarities to Resident Evil were dismissed and strong comparisons drawn instead to Doctor Hauzer for which Overblood (created by the same development team) serves as a spiritual successor. The game was criticized for the appearance of the characters, their unrealistic movements, and the overall plot, and the game received low marks for play mechanics and controls. IGN stated, "OverBlood attempts to recreate the moodiness and horror of Resident Evil but never quite succeeds." Crispin Boyer of Electronic Gaming Monthly made the same unfavorable comparison to Resident Evil, but concluded more positively: "That's OK, because Overblood is still an engrossing adventure ... that packs a solid mix of puzzles and exploration." Next Generation, by contradiction, stated that "Despite the excellent graphics, the game just can't hold a player's interest. OverBlood could've used a little more action and a lot less wandering around."

German magazine Maniac gave it a score of 68 out of 100.

In 1998, a direct sequel was released entitled Overblood 2.

References

1996 video games
Adventure games
Electronic Arts games
1990s horror video games
PlayStation (console) games
PlayStation Network games
Riverhillsoft games
Science fiction video games
Single-player video games
Video games about cloning
Video games developed in Japan